Choline-phosphate cytidylyltransferase A is an enzyme that in humans is encoded by the PCYT1A gene.

References

Further reading